Tora's Husband is a 2022 Indian Assamese language film written, shot, edited, produced and directed by Rima Das.

The film premiered at the 2022 Toronto International Film Festival (TIFF)  in the prestigious Platform Prize section, followed by the Asian Premiere at Busan International Film Festival 2022 and the Indian Premiere at Kolkata International Film Festival 2022.

Rima Das dedicated this film to her father Bharat Chandra Das, who died during the COVID-19 pandemic.

Plot summary 
The drama shows a family man’s life unravelling in the face of the COVID-19 pandemic.

Cast 

 Abhijit Das as Jaan
 Tarali Kalita Das as Tora
 Bhuman Bhargav Das as Bhargav
 Purbanchali Das as Manu
 Nilima Das
 Simanta Malakar
 Mallika Das

Production 
The film was  shot in Das' home town of Chaygaon in Assam. Rima Das said of the film:

Critical reception 
 
The first Indian film to compete in the Platform section, and Rima Das' third film in a row to premiere at Toronto International Film Festival.

Ravi Srinivasan, the Festival Programmer at 2022 Toronto International Film Festival described the film as: 

The film has been receiving accolades for its realistic take of life during the pandemic at its Asian Premiere at Busan International Film Festival 2022 and the Indian Premiere at Kolkata International Film Festival 2022 and other festivals where the film has been showcased.

Official selection at festivals 

 Toronto International Film Festival (Platform Section) 
 Busan International Film Festival 2022
 World Film Festival of Bangkok 2022 
 Hainan Island International Film Festival 2022 
 Kolkata International Film Festival 2022

References

External links 

 
 

2022 films
2022 drama films
Indian drama films
2020s Indian films